The Kurdish population is estimated to be between 30 and 45 million. Most Kurdish people live in Kurdistan, which today is split between Iranian Kurdistan, Iraqi Kurdistan, Turkish Kurdistan, and Syrian Kurdistan.

There are also many Kurds among the Kurdish diaspora and in Red Kurdistan.

Kurdistan

The bulk of Kurdish groups in Kurdistan are Sunni (mostly of the Shafi'i school), but there are significant minorities adhering to Shia Islam (especially Alevis), Yazidism, Yarsanism, Christianity and Judaism.

Turkey

According to a report by Turkish agency KONDA, in 2006, out of the total population of 73 million people in Turkey there were 11.4 million Kurds and Zazas living in Turkey (close to 15.68% of the total population). The Turkish newspaper Milliyet reported in 2008 that the Kurdish population in Turkey is 12.6 million; although this also includes 3 million Zazas. According to the World Factbook, Kurdish people make up 18% of Turkey's population (about 14 million, out of 77.8 million people). Kurdish sources put the figure at 10 to 15 million Kurds in Turkey.

Kurds mostly live in Northern Kurdistan, in Southeastern and Eastern Anatolia. But large Kurdish populations can be found in western Turkey due to internal migration. According to Rüstem Erkan, Istanbul is the province with the largest Kurdish population in Turkey.

Iran

From the 7 million Iranian Kurds, majority who are Sunni. Shia Kurds inhabit Kermanshah Province, except for those parts where people are Jaff, and Ilam Province Province; as well as some parts of Kurdistan, Hamadan and Zanjan provinces. The Kurds of Khorasan Province in northeastern Iran are also adherents of Shia Islam. During the Shia revolution in Iran the major Kurdish political parties were unsuccessful in absorbing Shia Kurds, who at that period had no interest in autonomy. However, since the 1990s Kurdish nationalism has seeped into the Shia Kurdish area partly due to outrage against government's violent suppression of Kurds farther north.

Iraq

Kurds constitute approximately 17% of Iraq's population. They are the majority in at least three provinces in northern Iraq which are together known as Iraqi Kurdistan. Kurds also have a presence in Kirkuk, Mosul, Khanaqin, and Baghdad. Around 300,000 Kurds live in the Iraqi capital Baghdad, 50,000 in the city of Mosul and around 100,000 elsewhere in southern Iraq.

Kurds led by Mustafa Barzani were engaged in heavy fighting against successive Iraqi regimes from 1960 to 1975. In March 1970, Iraq announced a peace plan providing for Kurdish autonomy. The plan was to be implemented in four years. However, at the same time, the Iraqi regime started an Arabization program in the oil-rich regions of Kirkuk and Khanaqin. The peace agreement did not last long, and in 1974, the Iraqi government began a new offensive against the Kurds. Moreover, in March 1975, Iraq and Iran signed the Algiers Accord, according to which Iran cut supplies to Iraqi Kurds. Iraq started another wave of Arabization by moving Arabs to the oil fields in Kurdistan, particularly those around Kirkuk. Between 1975 and 1978, 200,000 Kurds were deported to other parts of Iraq.

Syria

Kurds are the largest ethnic minority in Syria and make up nine percent of the country's population. Syrian Kurds have faced routine discrimination and harassment by the government.

Syrian Kurdistan is an unofficial name used by some to describe the Kurdish inhabited regions of northern and northeastern Syria. The northeastern Kurdish inhabited region covers the greater part of Hasakah Governorate. The main cities in this region are Qamishli and Hasakah. Another region with significant Kurdish population is Kobanê (Ayn al-Arab) in the northern part of Syria near the town of Jarabulus and also the city of Afrin and its surroundings along the Turkish border.

Many Kurds seek political autonomy for the Kurdish inhabited areas of Syria, similar to Iraqi Kurdistan in Iraq, or outright independence as part of Kurdistan. The name "Western Kurdistan" (Kurdish: Rojavayê Kurdistanê) is also used by Kurds to name the Syrian Kurdish inhabited areas in relation to Kurdistan. Since the Syrian civil war, Syrian government forces have abandoned many Kurdish-populated areas, leaving the Kurds to fill the power vacuum and govern these areas autonomously.

Transcaucasus

Armenia

According to the 2011 Armenian Census, 37,470 Kurds live in Armenia. They mainly live in the western parts of Armenia.  The Kurds of the former Soviet Union first began writing Kurdish in the Armenian alphabet in the 1920s, followed by Latin in 1927, then Cyrillic in 1945, and now in both Cyrillic and Latin.
The Kurds in Armenia established a Kurdish radio broadcast from Yerevan and the first Kurdish newspaper Riya Teze.  There is a Kurdish Department in the Yerevan State Institute of Oriental studies. The Kurds of Armenia were the first exiled country to have access to media such as radio, education and press in their native tongue but many Kurds, from 1939 to 1959 were listed as the Azeri population or even as Armenians.

Georgia

According to the 2002 Georgian Census, 20,843 Kurds live in Georgia The Kurds in Georgia mainly live in the capital of Tbilisi and Rustavi. According to a United Nations High Commissioner for Refugees report from 1998, about 80% of the Kurdish population in Georgia are assimilated Kurds.

Diaspora

Russia

According to the 2010 Russian Census, 63,818 Kurds live in Russia. Russia has maintained warm relations with the Kurds for a long time, During the early 19th century, the main goal of the Russian Empire was to ensure the neutrality of the Kurds, in the wars against Persia and the Ottoman Empire. In the beginning of the 19th century, Kurds settled in Transcaucasia, at a time when Transcaucasia was incorporated into the Russian Empire. In the 20th century, Kurds were persecuted and exterminated by the Turks and Persians, a situation that led Kurds to move to Russia.

Lebanon

The existence of a community of at least 125,000 Kurds is the product of several waves of immigrants, the first major wave was in the period of 1925–1950 when thousands of Kurds fled violence and poverty in Turkey. Kurds in Lebanon go back far as the twelfth century A.D. when the Ayyubids arrived there. Over the next few centuries, several other Kurdish families were sent to Lebanon by a number of powers to maintain rule in those regions, others moved as a result of poverty and violence in Kurdistan. These Kurdish groups settled in and ruled many areas of Lebanon for a long period of time. Kurds of Lebanon settled in Lebanon because of Lebanon's pluralistic society.

European Union

The Kurdish diaspora in the European Union is most significant in Germany, France, Sweden, Belgium and the Netherlands. Kurds from Turkey went to Germany and France during the 1960s as immigrant workers. Thousands of Kurdish refugees and political refugees fled from Turkey to Sweden during the 1970s and onward, and from Iraq during the 1980s and 1990s.

In France, the Iranian Kurds make up the majority of the community.  However, thousands of Iraqi Kurds also arrived in the mid-1990s. More recently, Syrian Kurds have been entering France illegally

In the United Kingdom, Kurds first began to immigrate between 1974 and 1975 when the rebellion of Iraqi Kurds against the Iraqi government was repressed. The Iraqi government began to destroy Kurdish villages and forced many Kurds to move to barren land in the south. These events resulted in many Kurds fleeing to the United Kingdom. Thus, the Iraqi Kurds make up a large part of the community. In 1979, Ayatollah Khomeini came to power in Iran and installed Islamic law. There was widespread political oppression and persecution of the Kurdish community. Since the late 1970s the number of people from Iran seeking asylum in Britain has remained high. In 1988, Saddam Hussein launched the Anfal campaign in the northern Iraq. This included mass executions and disappearances of the Kurdish community. The use of chemical weapons against thousands of towns and villages in the region, as well as the town of Halabja increased the number of Iraq Kurds entering the United Kingdom. A large number of Kurds also came to the United Kingdom following the 1980 military coup in Turkey. More recently, immigration has been due to the continued political oppression and the repression of ethnic and religious minorities in Iraq and Iran. Estimates of the Kurdish population in the United Kingdom are as high as 200–250,000.

In Denmark, there is a significant number of Iraqi political refugees, many of which are Kurds.

In Finland, most Kurds arrived in the 1990s as Iraqi refugees. Kurds in Finland have no great attachment to the Iraqi state because of their position as a persecuted minority. Thus, they feel more accepted and comfortable in Finland, many wanting to get rid of their Iraqi citizenship.

From 1994 to 1999, 43,759 Kurds entered Greece illegally and of the 9,797 who applied for asylum 524 were granted it.

North America

In the United States, it is believed that the Kurdish population is from 15,000 to 20,000. other sources claim approximately 58,000, During the 1991 Persian Gulf War, about 10,000 Iraqi refugees were admitted to the United States, most of which were Kurds and Shiites who had assisted or were sympathisers of the U.S –led war. Nashville, Tennessee has the nation's largest population of Kurdish people, with an estimated 8,000–11,000. There are also Kurds in Southern California, Los Angeles, San Diego, and Dallas, Texas.

In Canada, the Kurdish community  is 11,685 based on the Canadian Census 2011, among which the Iraqi Kurds make up the largest group of Kurds in Canada, exceeding the numbers of Kurds from Turkey, Iran and Syria. Kurdish immigration was largely the result of the Iran–Iraq War, the Gulf War and Syrian Civil War. Thus, many Iraqi Kurds immigrated to Canada due to the constant wars and suppression of Kurds and Shiites by the Iraqi government.

Oceania

In Australia, Kurdish migrants first arrived in the second half of the 1960s, mainly from Turkey. However, in the late 1970s families from Syria and Lebanon were also present in Australia. Since the second half of the 1980s, the majority of Kurds arriving in Australia have been from Iraq and Iran; many of them were accepted under the Humanitarian Programme. However, Kurds from Lebanon, Armenia and Georgia have also migrated to Australia. The majority live in Melbourne and Sydney.

Japan

The Japanese government has not granted refugee status. While 3,415 Kurds have so far applied for refugee status, none has yet received it.

Statistics by country

Autochthonous community

Transcaucasus

Europe

Middle East

Asia

Americas and Oceania

Notes

See also 

Kurdification

References

Bibliography

.
 Baser, Bahar.“Kurdish Diaspora Political Activism in Europe with a Particular Focus on Great Britain.”, Diaspora Dialogues for Development and Peace Project, Berlin: Berghof Peace Support, June 2011.
.
.
.
.
.
.
.
.
.
.
.
.

Kurdish diaspora